Südharz (literally "South Harz")  is a municipality in the Mansfeld-Südharz district, Saxony-Anhalt, Germany. It was formed on 1 January 2010 by the merger of the former municipalities Bennungen, Breitenstein, Breitungen, Dietersdorf, Drebsdorf, Hainrode, Hayn, Kleinleinungen, Questenberg (incl. Agnesdorf), Roßla (incl. Dittichenrode), Rottleberode, Schwenda and Uftrungen. Wickerode and the town Stolberg were added in September 2010. These 15 former municipalities are now Ortschaften or municipal divisions of Südharz.

References

 
Mansfeld-Südharz